Alexander Nicholas Tapp (born 7 June 1982) is an English football (soccer) player. He is a midfielder, who has played in the English Football League for Wimbledon and their successor Milton Keynes Dons.

Career

Wimbledon/Milton Keynes Dons
Born in Redhill, England, Tapp started his football career with Wimbledon in 1994 and represented England Schoolboys in 1998 at the age of 15. He made his professional debut for Wimbledon in the First Division on 31 August 2002 in a 3–2 victory against Wolverhampton Wanderers and scored his first goal two weeks later in a 4–1 League Cup win against Southend United. Less than two months after his debut, Tapp suffered a hamstring injury which kept him out of the Wimbledon side for three months. He played in Wimbledon's final two seasons in The Football League, playing 43 games and scoring four goals, although his second season was cut short in January following a serious knee injury.

Wimbledon were relegated at the end of the season and finished bottom of the First Division table. The club had moved to Milton Keynes in 2003 and at the start of the 2004–05 season, the club was relaunched under the name of Milton Keynes Dons, now playing in the renamed third tier League One. Tapp suffered more injury problems and played only a further 15 games in his final season in The Football League. In August 2006, when Milton Keynes decided not to extend his contract, Tapp left after 12 years with the club.

English non-League
After leaving Milton Keynes, he had several unsuccessful trials with other league clubs, including Brentford and Oxford United, and played in one Conference South game for Lewes, before he joined Isthmian League Premier Division side Tonbridge Angels in February 2007. Tapp made his debut for Tonbridge against Margate on 20 February but was substituted during the first half after he picked up an injury. During the 2007–08 season, he appeared for Chipstead, who played in the Isthmian League Division One South.

Austin Aztex
In the late summer of 2008, Tapp moved to the United States and after seven months during which he acclimatised to the Texan weather and astroturf pitches, he joined the Austin Aztex ahead of their first season in the United Soccer Leagues First Division. He was the club's second English signing, following Gifton Noel-Williams, and joined another expatriate Adrian Heath, the manager of the side.

References

External links
Austin Aztex bio

1982 births
Living people
People from Redhill, Surrey
English footballers
Association football midfielders
Wimbledon F.C. players
Milton Keynes Dons F.C. players
Lewes F.C. players
Tonbridge Angels F.C. players
Austin Aztex FC players
English Football League players
USL First Division players
Chipstead F.C. players
English expatriate sportspeople in the United States
Expatriate soccer players in the United States
English expatriate footballers
People educated at Woodcote High School